David or Dave Lewis may refer to:

Academics
A. David Lewis (born 1977), American comic writer and scholar of religion and literature
David Lewis (anthropologist) (born 1960), English scholar of development
David Lewis (diplomatologist), English academic of peace and conflict
David Lewis (lawyer) (–1584), Welsh civil lawyer and first Principal of Jesus College, Oxford
David Lewis (philosopher) (1941–2001), American philosopher
David Lewis (psychologist) (born 1942), English neuropsychologist
David A. Lewis, American psychiatrist and neuroscientist
David C. Lewis (physician) (1935–2020), addictions treatment and drug policy expert
David Levering Lewis (born 1936), American historian and biographer
David Malcolm Lewis (1928–1994), English ancient historian
David W. Lewis (1815–1885), American agriculturalist and Confederate Georgian politician

Actors and film producers
David Lewis (American actor) (1916–2000), American actor
David Lewis (Canadian actor) (born 1976), Canadian actor
David Lewis (producer) (1903–1987), American film producer

Architects
David Lewis, FAIA, American architect and co-founder of Urban Design Associates
David J. Lewis (born 1966), American architect, founding partner with Lewis.Tsurumaki.Lewis (LTL Architects)

Businessmen
Dave Lewis (businessman) (born 1965), English businessman
David Lewis (designer) (1939–2011), British industrial designer
David Lewis (English merchant) (1823–1885), English merchant and philanthropist 
David Edward Lewis (1866–1941), Welsh businessman and philanthropist
David S. Lewis (1917–2003), American aerospace engineer and engineering industry executive

Clergymen
David Lewis (Anglican priest, born 1760) (1760–1850), Welsh Anglican priest and Rector of Garthbeibio, Montgomeryshire
David Lewis (Archdeacon of Carmarthen) (1839–1901), British Anglican priest and Archdeacon of Carmarthen
David Lewis (Jesuit priest) (1616–1679), Welsh Catholic priest and martyr
David Lewis (priest, born 1814) (1814–1895), Welsh Anglican priest who converted to Catholicism

Musicians
Dave Lewis (American musician) (1938–1998), African-American Seattle rock musician
Dave Lewis (Northern Irish musician) (born 1951), Northern Irish singer-songwriter
David Lewis (Australian musician) (born ), Australian jazz and pop musician
David Lewis (singer) (born 1958), American lead singer for the R&B group Atlantic Starr
David C. Lewis (musician), American keyboardist and composer

Politicians
Dave Lewis (politician) (born 1942), American state legislator in Montana
David Lewis (British MP), British Member of Parliament for Carmarthen
David Lewis (lord mayor) (born 1947), British solicitor and Lord Mayor of London
David Lewis (Canadian politician) (1909–1981), Canadian politician and lawyer, leader of the New Democratic Party
David Lewis, 1st Baron Brecon (1905–1976), Welsh businessman and Conservative politician
David Chester Lewis (1884–1975), American lawyer, politician, and judge
David John Lewis (1869–1952), American congressman and state politician in Maryland
David P. Lewis (1820–1884), American Confederate politician and Governor of Alabama
David R. Lewis (born 1971), American state legislator in North Carolina
David W. Lewis (1815–1885), American agriculturalist and Confederate Georgian politician

Sportsmen

American football
Dave Lewis (linebacker) (1954–2020), American football linebacker
Dave Lewis (punter) (born 1945), American football punter
David Lewis (American football) (born 1961), American football tight end

Association football
Dai Lewis (footballer) (1912–?), Welsh international footballer
Dave Lewis (footballer), footballer and leading goalscorer for Cheltenham Town F.C.
David Morral Lewis (1864–1925), Welsh international footballer

Rugby
Dai Lewis (1866–1943), Welsh rugby union forward
Dave Lewis (rugby union) (born 1989), Gloucester rugby scrum-half
David Lewis (rugby league), Welsh rugby league footballer

Other sports

Dave Lewis (ice hockey) (born 1953), Canadian hockey player and coach
Dave Lewis (racing driver) (1881–1928), American racecar driver
David Lewis (bobsleigh) (born 1936), British Olympic bobsledder
David Lewis (Zimbabwean cricketer) (1927–2013), Zimbabwean cricketer
David Lewis (cricketer, born 1940), Welsh cricketer
David Lewis (sport shooter) (1879–?), British Olympic shooter
David Lewis (tennis) (born 1964), New Zealand tennis player

Writers
David Lewis, writer of Christian fiction, some co-written with his wife Beverly Lewis
David Lewis (poet) (1682–1760), British poet
David Emrys Lewis (1887–1954), Welsh poet and journalist

Other
David Lewis (adventurer) (1917–2002), navigator and adventurer
David "Robber" Lewis (1790–1820), American criminal
David Thomas Lewis (1912–1983), judge of the United States Court of Appeals for the Tenth Circuit
David Lewis (Indiana judge) (1909–1985), Justice of the Indiana Supreme Court
Death of David Glenn Lewis (1953–1993), unresolved crime

See also
David Maybury-Lewis (1929–2007), British anthropologist